Olsztyn is a Polish parliamentary constituency in the Warmian-Masurian Voivodeship.  It elects ten members of the Sejm.

The district has the number '35' for elections to the Sejm and is named after the city of Olsztyn.  It includes the counties of Ełk, Giżycko, Gołdap, Kętrzyn, Mrągowo, Nidzica, Olecko, Olsztyn, Pisz, Szczytno, and Węgorzewo and the city county of Olsztyn.

List of members

Sejm

Footnotes

Electoral districts of Poland
Warmian-Masurian Voivodeship
Olsztyn